Bedřichovice is a village and an administrative part of Šlapanice in the South Moravian Region of the Czech Republic. As of a census taken in 2011, it had 338 inhabitants.

Geography
It lies in the Dyje–Svratka Valley. It lies on the right bank of the stream Říčka.

References

Populated places in Brno-Country District
Neighbourhoods in the Czech Republic